The King's School, Chester, is a co-educational private day school for pupils aged 4 to 18. It is one of the seven 'King's Schools' established (or re-endowed and renamed) by King Henry VIII in 1541 after the Dissolution of the Monasteries.

It is situated outside the city of Chester, England. The school is a member of the Headmasters' and Headmistresses' Conference. The school comprises an Infant school (years 4–7), a Junior school (years 7–11), a Senior school (years 11–16) and a Sixth form (years 16–18) in which the students choose their A-level subjects.

History
An ancient foundation, attached to a monastery that King Henry VIII had dissolved, it still served a purpose teaching grammar to potential ordinands. It was reconstituted in 1541 as a joint church state enterprise and operated for 400 years in the former monks' refectory. It was one of seven schools in this category, the others being Canterbury, Rochester, Peterborough, Worcester, Gloucester, and Ely.
In 1869 new school buildings were constructed and they were formally opened by Gladstone.
The school motto is "Rex dedit, benedicat Deus” (The King gave it, may God bless it), which was given by John Saul Howson, Dean of Chester. John Saul Howson was the chief instrument in the building and endowing of the King's School, and in its reorganization on a broader basis.

Description
Since 1960, The King's School has been based at its Wrexham Road site on the outskirts of Chester. It has a Sixth Form Centre, a library (the Wickson Library) and a music school (the Tim Turvey Music School). Sports facilities include a swimming pool, all-weather sports pitches, grass sports pitches, a cricket pavilion, and a boat house on the River Dee.

Academia

In September 2011, King's adopted a new curriculum alongside its shift from an eight-period to a five-period day. This involved substantial changes, introducing 'enrichment' lessons and replacing the GCSE courses with IGCSE.

Extra-curricular activities
The school's pupils engage the Duke of Edinburgh's Award scheme. 
The King's School's Combined Cadet Force (CCF) is a voluntary contingent within the CCF. It consists of the mandatory Army Section, with an additional RAF Section. The King's School has also been successful in the F1 in Schools competition, sending a team to the global finals in 2016.

Publications
The Herald is the school's magazine and is published on a termly basis for parents and pupils. Its articles are about current pupils, teachers and former pupils.

Sports

Hockey
In 2011, King's appointed hockey coach Simon Egerton, who is a member of the England hockey team.

Rowing
The King's School Rowing Club has been in existence since 1883 with the school's boat house situated on the River Dee in the centre of Chester and is affiliated to British Rowing. Rowing is offered as part of the sports curriculum from the third year onwards.

The King's rowers often compete in the top levels of school's competitions, and count numerous ex-Boat-Race crew members alongside National and Olympic squad members amongst it Old King's Scholars Alumni including seven Olympians, three in the London 2012 games. Gold and silver medallists – two gold and one silver Olympic medallists. Olympic Finalists – three in 2012. 14 x Oxford and Cambridge Blues. 47 x GB Senior World Championship representatives – since 1960 and 36 x GB Junior International representatives – since 1970.

Headmaster

The school's headmaster (since 2017) is George Hartley. He has an undergraduate degree in geography and an postgraduate degree in Environmental Sciences. He has previously been the headmaster/principal of two other British schools.

Previous headmasters

2007–2017 - Chris Ramsey, linguist
2000–2007 - Tim Turvey, biologist
1981–2000 - Roger Wickson, historian

A full list of previous headmasters are engraved on a board displayed in the school.

Notable alumni

Post-1900

Godfrey Ashby, former bishop of St John's, South Africa
Michael Axworthy
Hagan Bayley, scientist and head of chemical biology at the University of Oxford
Graham Benton, British and world indoor rowing champion
Michael Burdekin, civil engineer and emeritus professor of the University of Manchester
John Carroll, mathematician, physicist and former professor of natural philosophy at the University of Aberdeen
Matthew Collins (academic), archaeologist
Rob Leslie-Carter, engineer
Sir James Dutton, former commandant-general, Royal Marines
Rob Eastaway, mathematician and ex-puzzle writer for New Scientist
Simon Edge, novelist
James Fair, England and Great Britain hockey goalkeeper
Nickolas Grace, actor
George Guest, organist and choirmaster at St John's College, Cambridge
Matthew Hancock, former secretary of state for digital, culture, media and sport (2018), secretary of state for health and social care (2018–21) and member of Parliament for West Suffolk
Phillip Hallam-Baker, computer scientist, mostly known for his contributions to Internet security
Tom James, Olympic gold medal oarsman
Glyn Smallwood Jones, colonial administrator and last governor of Nyasaland
Trevor Kletz, safety engineer and author on industrial safety
Steve Leonard, television vet and BBC presenter
Martin Lewis, financial journalist and founder of the MoneySavingExpert.com consumer finance website
Hugh Lloyd, comedy actor
Patrick Mercer, member of Parliament for Newark
Seb Morris, racing driver
Mike Parry, journalist and radio presenter
Ronald Pickup, actor
Jonathan Samuels, Australia correspondent with Sky News
Mark Jay, Two time Pointless Champion Lamintations
George Drewry Squibb, lawyer
David Whitley, author of The Midnight Charter
Olivia Whitlam, Olympic rower
Arnold Frederic Wilkins, radar pioneer

Pre-1900
Randle Ayrton, film and stage actor, producer and director
John Bradbury, 1st Baron Bradbury, civil servant and chief economic advisor to the government during World War I
Thomas Brassey, civil engineer
Edward Brerewood, mathematician, logician and antiquary
Charles Burney, music historian, musician, composer and philosopher
John Byrom, poet and developer of geometric shorthand
Randolph Caldecott, illustrator
William Chaderton, academic, clergyman and former Regius Professor of Divinity at the University of Cambridge
John Churton Collins, literary critic and former professor of English literature at the University of Birmingham
Piers Claughton, clergyman and former archdeacon of London
Thomas Legh Claughton, first bishop of St Albans and former Oxford Professor of Poetry
George Cotton, clergyman and educator, known for establishing schools in British India
Sir Peter Denis, 1st Baronet, naval officer and member of Parliament
John Downham, clergyman and theologian
Joseph Everett Dutton, pathologist, physician and tropical medicine specialist
Thomas Falconer, clergyman and classical scholar
Thomas Francis, physician, former president of the Royal College of Physicians and former Regius Professor of Medicine at the University of Oxford
Christopher Goodman, clergyman and writer
William Lee Hankey, painter and illustrator
Rowland Hill, 1st Viscount Hill, former member of Parliament for Shrewsbury and Commander-in-Chief of the Forces
George Lloyd, clergyman
Bert Lipsham, England international footballer and FA Cup winner with Sheffield United in 1902.
George Ormerod, antiquary and historian
William Parry, Elizabethan courtier, MP and spy, executed 1585.
Sir Ralph Champneys Williams, colonial governor of the British Windward Islands and Newfoundland and Labrador
Thomas Wilson, clergyman

The Chester Association of Old King's Scholars (CAOKS), founded in 1866, exists to maintain links between former students. It is one of the longest established alumni associations in the country. The school has recently established OAKS (Organization of Alumni of The King's School) to maintain relations with former pupils. OAKS is free to join and open to all alumni.

See also 

List of English and Welsh endowed schools (19th century)

References

External links
Official website

Ancient grammar schools of Cheshire
Educational institutions established in the 1540s
Private schools in Cheshire West and Chester
Member schools of the Headmasters' and Headmistresses' Conference
1541 establishments in England
Schools in Chester